Richard Cameron-Wolfe is an American composer and pianist.

Early life and education 

Cameron-Wolfe was born in Cleveland, Ohio. He studied at Oberlin College and Indiana University with Joseph Battista and Menahem Pressler (piano) and Bernard Heiden, Iannis Xenakis, Juan Orrego-Salas, and John Eaton (composition).

Career
Before moving to New York City, he taught at Indiana University, Radford College (Virginia), and the University of Wisconsin-Milwaukee. In New York he performed and composed for several major ballet and modern dance companies, including the Joffrey Ballet and the Jose Limon Company. He then taught music theory and history, composition, and music resources for choreographers at Purchase College, State University of New York from 1978-2002. His ideas on the intersection between choreography and music are cited in Oxford's volume Gestures of Music Theater: The Performativity of Song and Dance. He composed the libretto or the opera Los Caminos del Paxos with Arturio Arias.

Since 1989 Cameron-Wolfe has been a frequent guest of music schools and festivals in Russia and former Soviet nations and a promoter of the exchange of musical ideas, scores and performances between those the countries and the US.  He has also acted as co-editor of FULCRAM: an annual of poetry and aesthetics.
 
As a pianist, Cameron-Wolfe frequently performs the music of Dane Rudhyar in the United States, Sweden, Finland, The Netherlands, Russia, Azerbaijan, and Bulgaria. Unusually, he has given four uninterrupted solo performances of Satie’s 24-hour Vexations."  Cameron-Wolfe also performs the works of lesser-played composers of the early 20th century who provided the transition from late Romanticism into post-World War II “sound art”. His current repertoire includes works by Leo Ornstein, his mentor Dane Rudhyar, and Charles Ives.

Compositions 

as he seemed to appear to the beast in the distance … (activities for percussionist)
ARQ: Region III Refuge - piano 4-hands, violin
Code of Unsilence: A Prayer - piano
Heretic (Micro Opera for Guitarist)
Kyrie (Mantra) - flute trio
Labyrinths - high voice, cello, piano
Lapis Lazuli - fl/alto flute; piano
Le Pont des Ames - piano, string orchestra 
Lilith - violin, piano
Lonesome Dove - a true story (for saxophone, dancer, and stagehand)
A Measure of Love and Silence
MeMarie (micro-opera for soprano alone)
Reconciliation - ob/eng hn, Bb/Eb cl, bsn, hn, tbn, 2 vln, vla, 2 vcl,
Roerich Rhapsody—Liaison - cello, piano
Sacre-Lege - fl, cl, vln, vcl, perc
A Song Built from Fire (for singing pianist)
Time Refracted - cello, piano
Variations and Liebestod - unaccompanied clarinet

Discography 

Burning Questions
Paris-X

References

External links
 Richard Cameron-Wolfe at Furious 
Profile at Composers.com
Profile on ChoreoTheatro
Labyrinths on YouTube
Rope Act on Vimeo

20th-century classical composers
21st-century classical composers
American male classical composers
American classical composers
Indiana University alumni
Oberlin College alumni
Musicians from Cleveland
Year of birth missing (living people)
Living people
Indiana University faculty
Radford University faculty
University of Wisconsin–Milwaukee faculty
Classical musicians from Ohio
20th-century American male musicians
21st-century American male musicians